My Old Kentucky Home is a short animation film originally released in June 1926, by Max and Dave Fleischer of Fleischer Studios as one of the Song Car-Tunes series. The series, between May 1924 and September 1926, eventually totaled 36 films, of which 19 were made with sound. This cartoon features the original lyrics of "My Old Kentucky Home" (1853) by Stephen Foster, and was recorded in the Lee de Forest Phonofilm sound-on-film system.

My Old Kentucky Home appears to be the first attempt at animated dialogue in cartoon history, as an unnamed dog, an early prototype of future studio mascot Bimbo, in the film mouths the words "Follow the ball, and join in, everybody" in remarkable synchronization though the animation was somewhat limited, making sure that lip-synch was synchronized perfectly. The Fleischers had previously started the follow the bouncing ball gimmick in their Song Car-Tune My Bonnie Lies Over the Ocean (released September 15, 1925).

This film came two years after the Fleischers started the Song Car-Tune series in May 1924.

A clip from the film is used in the opening credits of the Futurama episode "Why Must I Be a Crustacean in Love?"

Reception
Motion Picture News (March 23, 1926): "The old familiar favorite 'My Old Kentucky Home' furnishes the subject for this Max Fleischer Song Car-Tune. The verses are shown in the usual manner and the comedy handling of the chorus shows a darky girl leaping from word to word doing stunts... This should prove one of the most popular of the series."

The Film Daily (March 28, 1926): "Ko-Ko and his quartet render this time the old southern classic 'My Old Kentucky Home', with the help of the audience of course. Fleischer has a new instruction for the opening, showing the quartet as a band marching and playing, and winding up on the stage of the theatre. There is always a humorous touch added to the chorus of the song. This time in the shape of a little pickaninny who dances along on top of the words."

References

External links
 
 My Old Kentucky Home at SilentEra

1926 short films
American musical comedy films
1920s musical comedy films
American black-and-white films
1920s American animated films
Phonofilm short films
Fleischer Studios short films
American silent short films
1926 animated films
Short films directed by Dave Fleischer
1926 comedy films
Early sound films
1920s English-language films
American animated short films
Silent American comedy films